Jónas Guðni Sævarsson (born 28 November 1983) is an Icelandic footballer who currently plays for Keflavík as a midfielder.

Career

Club
He started his career in Keflavík. In 2007, he left that club for Úrvalsdeild rivals KR Reykjavík; he stayed with them until summer 2009, when he signed for Swedish club Halmstads BK. He made his debut for them on 27 July 2009 when he came on as a substitute against Malmö FF, a 0–3 defeat. Sævarsson returned to KR in 2012. He remained at the club for three seasons, before re-signing for his first club Keflavík in November 2015.

International
Shortly after his move to KR Reykjavíkur he also made his debut for the Icelandic national team. He scored his two goals for the national team against Portugal and England.

Honours

Club
 KR Reykjavíkur
 Icelandic Cup: 2008
 Keflavík
 Icelandic Cup: 2006

References

External links

1983 births
Living people
Jonas Guthni Saevarsson
Jonas Guthni Saevarsson
Jonas Guthni Saevarsson
Jonas Guthni Saevarsson
Association football midfielders
Jonas Guthni Saevarsson
Allsvenskan players
Jonas Guthni Saevarsson
Jonas Guthni Saevarsson
Halmstads BK players
Jonas Guthni Saevarsson
Expatriate footballers in Sweden